The Aulerci were a group of Gallic peoples dwelling in the modern region of Normandy, between the Loire (Liger) and the Seine (Sequana) rivers, during the Iron Age and the Roman period. They were divided into  the Cenomani, the most powerful of them, the Eburovices, the Diablintes, and the Brannovices. The relationship that linked them together remains uncertain. According to historian Venceslas Kruta, they could have been pagi that got separated from a larger ethnic group of the pre-Roman period.

Name
The Gaulish ethnonym Aulerci is generally interpreted as meaning 'those who are far away from their traces' (tracks, paths), composed of the ablative prefix au- ('out of, away from') attached to the root lerg- ('trace', cf. MIr. lorg, OBret. lerg). Pierre-Yves Lambert has also proposed a comparison with the Old Irish lerg ('slope, brink'), or with the Welsh/Breton alarch ('swan').

History 
According to Livy, they joined Bellovesus' legendary migrations towards Italy ca. 600 BC, along with the Aeduii, Ambarri, Arverni, Carnutes and Senones.

Julius Caesar (B. G. ii. 34) names the Aulerci with the Veneti and the other maritime states. In B. G. vii. 75, he enumerates, among the clients of the Aedui, the Aulerci Brannovices and Brannovii, as the common text stands; but the names in this chapter of Caesar are corrupt, and Brannovii does not appear to be genuine. If the name Aulerci Brannovices is genuine in vii. 75, this branch of the Aulerci, which was dependent on the Aedui, must be distinguished from those Aulerci who were situated between the Lower Seine and the Loire, and separated from the Aedui by the Senones, Carnutes, and Bituriges Cubi.

Again, in vii. 75, Caesar mentions the Aulerci Cenomani and the Aulerci Eburovices. In B. G.vii. 75 Caesar mentions the maritime states (ii. 34) under the name of the Armoric states; but his list does not agree with the list in ii. 34, and it does not contain the Aulerci as the Aulerci were not regarded a maritime tribe. Caesar (iii. 17) mentions a tribe of Diablintes or Diablintres, to whom Ptolemy gives the generic name of Aulerci. It seems, then, that Aulerci was a general name under which several tribes were included.

References

Bibliography 

 
 
 
 
 
 

 

Historical Celtic peoples
Gauls
Tribes of pre-Roman Gaul
Tribes involved in the Gallic Wars
History of Normandy